The Potter's House Christian Fellowship is a Pentecostal church based in the United States of America. It was established in Prescott, Arizona in 1970 by Wayman Mitchell. Originally a part of the Foursquare church, Mitchell split the church away in 1983 and established an independent fellowship. Since then, the church itself has undergone a number of splits. The church has been criticised in a number of areas including high levels of control, extreme commitment requirements, and the mistreatment of former members. It has been labelled by many ex-members as a cult.

History
In 1969, Wayman Mitchell asked for a ministerial position and was appointed to serve as the minister of the Foursquare church in Prescott, Arizona. Mitchell promoted personal witnessing which saw much church growth, primarily from the youth of the hippie movement and resulted in an overflowing church by the early seventies. Mitchell began to establish new churches which were originally called The Door (and later, these churches were called the Potter's House), first within Arizona and interstate, then overseas. Mitchell discouraged his disciples from attending bible schools due to his own negative experiences in them so the men who he sent out did not receive full ordinations from Foursquare. According to Nathaniel Van Cleave, Mitchell permitted only his own style of primitive and militant evangelism, isolated his disciples from other Foursquare ministers and as a group, they walked out of conference meetings that they disagreed with. Although Mitchell was the state superintendent, he only focused on his own churches, excluding all other Foursquare churches that were under his care. Over time, this caused resentment among the excluded congregations and at least one church left the denomination as a result.

At the 1983 Foursquare convention, a large number of pastors brought complaints against Mitchell to the executive council meeting. Mitchell made no attempt to respond to the complaints. Instead, he and his followers left the conference. A special meeting was later held with Mitchell in an attempt to establish understanding and continued fellowship but this attempt was unsuccessful. Within weeks, Mitchell and the churches which he had planted severed their ties with Foursquare and became an independent fellowship.

In 1990, approximately 100 churches split from the Potter's House. The split was partially due to restrictions which prevented them from maturing and enlarging their expressions of faith.

In 2001, a second split occurred with around 160 churches leaving the fellowship due to disagreements with the direction the fellowship was heading in.

As of November 2021 the church has over 2,900 churches worldwide.

Mitchell died on September 21, 2020 in Prescott, Arizona.

Doctrine and practice
The Potter's House Christian Fellowship holds Pentecostal beliefs with a strong emphasis on evangelism, church planting, and discipleship. Doctrines include salvation by faith, the infallibility of the bible, faith healing, and the second coming of Jesus Christ.

An intense program of evangelism is promoted with regular outreach events scheduled including, but not limited to, street evangelism, music concerts, movie nights, and revival meetings, with the intention of converting people and increasing church membership.

A major goal of the church is the establishment of new churches, commonly referred to as church planting. This is achieved through the in-house training of pastors who are then sent to start a new church. Local congregations, both new and established, have no say over who leads the church. Pastors in the Potter's House do not receive any formal theological training as this is considered a waste of time and bible college is believed to cause those wanting to become pastors to lose their passion for the church. Instead, the church uses a process called discipleship, a type of on-the-job training where men wanting to become ministers are mentored by their pastor for three years before starting their own church. These new pastors then go on to repeat the process by training their own disciples to start new churches. Women in the church are not encouraged to pursue careers as the church believes their place is in the home supporting their husbands.

Faith healing is another belief held by the church, which holds faith healing meetings and invites the public to attend. According to Kenneth Whelan, people can be healed if they forgive all sins committed against them and become Christians. Meetings generally consist of singing, a request for donations, a sermon, and an altar call, which is a request for people to come to the front and repent. After this, people are called to the front to be prayed for healing.

The church believes that participating in sin can result in physical problems. Homosexuality can cause deafness and idol worship can cause problems with eyesight.

Financial support for the church comes from the collection of tithes from its members (donating 10% of a member's gross income) and each church in turn also pays a tithe. Financial offerings over and above the tithe are also encouraged. According to an investigation by Chris Hayes, the church financial structure is set up in a pyramid structure, with each church sending 5% of its offering back to its Mother church and another 5% back to the head church in Prescott.

Criticism and controversy
The Potter's House has received much criticism throughout its existence and has been labelled by many as a cult. Major areas of criticism include the level of control exerted over its members, the intense level of commitment required, and the shunning and mistreatment of those who have left the church.

Controlling behaviour 
Lee Stubbs, a former fellowship pastor, stated that the church uses a subtle form of conditioning. "It's not some maniacal thing of someone demanding blood, but the leaders have a very persuasive power over people. There was a system of things in place that directed our lives."
While new members are given love and attention to make them want to stay in the church, many former pastors and members have stated that church techniques are designed to keep those in the congregation submissive, employing fear tactics, public ridicule, and shunning to ensure compliance.
Members are told not to question the pastor's leadership and those who do so are considered rebellious. According to Stubbs, loyalty to the pastor is equated to loyalty to God.
While the church has stated numerous times publicly that people are free to leave if they choose, former members have stated that pastors create a fear that if they do leave, they will be out of the will of God, their lives will fall apart, and they will go to hell. In one case, the parents of a former member were killed in a car accident shortly after she left the church. The church blamed the deaths on the ex-member for leaving.

Level of commitment 
The church requires an intense level of commitment from its members and uses psychological and emotional pressure to enforce that commitment. Stubbs stated that commitment to the church is constantly reinforced with phrases such as, "Every time the doors are open, you need to be here. You need to stay on fire for God. You need to be involved. You need to be committed. You need to be loyal." Members will spend up to seven nights a week at church in their commitment to the fellowship and have reported getting in trouble for leaving services early.

Shunning and mistreatment 
According to numerous former pastors and members, anyone leaving the church is considered to be a rebel and a backslider. Current members are told not to have anything to do with them and they will often be condemned from the pulpit. This can include not just the shunning of friends but the turning of family members against each other. In cases where interaction does occur, former members have reported receiving harassing letters and phone calls, and being slandered through rumours. In one case, church leaders were instructed to publicly renounce a pastor who had left the group.
Former members have consistently reported that time in the church has led to traumatic experiences both to individuals and to families. A therapist described the symptoms of one couple who had left the church as similar to those who suffer from post-traumatic stress disorder.
A court prevented a man from taking his 5-year-old daughter to the church after she was diagnosed with PTSD as a result of being traumatised by the pastor. The pastor had dressed up like the devil and placed the girl's hands into a bucket of fake blood with a cow's heart in it and yelled at her that she would never get her hand out. The pastor did not deny the event and stated that it was good to have some fear in your life.
Others stated the church had robbed them of self esteem and independence, and left them feeling spiritually shattered, while others said their involvement with the church led to divorce.

Lack of pastoral training 
Former pastors of the church have noted that not only do pastors have little experience when they are sent out but because the church does not send men to bible school, they are also poorly equipped in understanding the bible which leads to indoctrination in Potter's House methodology rather than having a bible-based background.

Cult 
The intensity of involvement and indoctrination by the church has led to many former members labelling the group a cult. The church has been accused of brainwashing its members resulting in the blind following of church beliefs and the division of families. Any doubts or questioning of the church is attributed to lying spirits and the voice of the devil, and is considered akin to doubting God. Rick Ross, a cult expert with extensive experience dealing with former Potter's House members, stated that while he does not consider the church to be a cult, it is a destructive group very close to being a cult.

Rape 
In 1984, church member Debbie Christensen told her pastor, Paul Campo, that she had been raped by another church member. Christensen stated that when she told Campo about the rape, he told her she probably deserved it and not to tell anyone else about it. Campo responded in a letter to The Arizona Republic stating that after Christensen told him about the alleged rape, he spoke with the accused rapist who convinced him that the sex was consensual. Christensen's mother also spoke with Campo about the alleged rape, who told her it was Christensen's fault and there was nothing he could do.
Church founder Wayman Mitchell contradicted Campo's claim in another letter to The Arizona Republic, stating that Christensen had not told Campo that she had been raped as he would have told her to go to the authorities and press charges. Mitchell stated that Christensen claimed she was raped because she was bitter and vindictive.

Homophobia 
The church holds a homophobic position in relation to the LGBTQI community and has screened anti-gay movies to the public. In a 2009 interview with the Waikato Times Scott McGrath stated that although it was still considered a sin, the church had softened its stance on homosexuality and would accept gay, lesbian, and transgender members. However, in 2018 founder Wayman Mitchell was recorded using a homophobic slur while preaching in Guam, referring to homosexuals as "little faggots" and claiming that the gay community was miserable. Mitchell's use of derogatory remarks from the pulpit had been previously noted in a report by Charisma magazine.

Intellectual Property Theft 
In August 2022 a Texan church performed a rewritten version of the stage show Hamilton over two nights without obtaining the rights to do so. Representatives for Hamilton were made aware of the production and issued a cease-and-desist letter for unauthorized use of intellectual property.  The Dramatists Guild, who represent playwrights, composers and lyricists, condemned the church for the unauthorized performance. After speaking with Hamilton’s lawyers, the church was allowed to proceed with its Saturday evening performance on the condition that it was not live-streamed or recorded, that photos and videos were not posted, and no further productions were performed. However, at the time the Hamilton team was unaware of the changes to the lyrics or the anti-LGBTQ+ sermon presented at the end of the show. A spokesman for Hamilton said they were “in the process of reviewing the unauthorized changes made to the script to determine further action.” In late August, Roman Gutierrez, the church’s pastor, issued an apology to Hamilton’s creator,  Lin-Manuel Miranda, promising to destroy all images, video, and sound recordings of their production and agreed to never stage the performance again. The church also agreed to pay damages for their actions. Hamilton representatives stated all damages would be donated to the South Texas Equality Project, a nonprofit coalition supporting the LGBTQ community. The church had previously performed an unauthorized, rewritten performance of Disney’s Beauty and the Beast in 2018.

References

Pentecostal denominations
Jesus movement
Christian organizations established in 1970
Pentecostal denominations established in the 20th century
Christian denominations established in the 20th century
Evangelical denominations in North America
Christian new religious movements
Cults